Valerio Bacigalupo (12 February 1924 – 4 May 1949) was an Italian footballer who played as a goalkeeper.

Born in Vado Ligure, he began his career with Savona. After a brief spell at Genoa, he moved to Torino in 1945, where he won four Serie A titles. He also represented the Italy national team.

Club career
Bacigalupo started his club career with home province side Savona. After a brief spell at Genoa he moved to Torino where he won Serie A four times in a row.

International career
Bacigalupo was called up in the Italy national football team five times between 1947 and 1949, making his senior international debut in a 3–1 win over Czechoslovakia on 14 December 1947.

Style of play

Regarded as one of the best goalkeepers of his generation, Bacigalupo was a modern and world-class goalkeeper, who revolutionised his position in Italy. A precocious talent, he was known for his strong physique, reactions and excellent positional sense, as well as his athletic diving saves. In addition do being an outstanding shot-stopper, he was also a dominant goalkeeper, known for his ability to come off his line to collect crosses.

Personal life
Valerio Bacigalupo's older brother, Manlio Bacigalupo, also played professional football before the Second World War, also serving as a goalkeeper for Genoa and Torino. Valerio died in the Superga air disaster with most of the Grande Torino team, which also formed a large part in the Italynational team at the time, which was scheduled to take part at the 1950 FIFA World Cup.

Legacy
After his death, the club where he started his career, Savona, named its ground Stadio Valerio Bacigalupo in his honour.

Honours

Torino
Serie A (4): 1945–46, 1946–47, 1947–48, 1948–49

Individual
Torino F.C. Hall of Fame: 2014

References

1924 births
Italian footballers
Italy international footballers
Association football goalkeepers
Serie A players
1949 deaths
Torino F.C. players
Genoa C.F.C. players
Sportspeople from the Province of Savona
Savona F.B.C. players
Footballers from Liguria
Footballers killed in the Superga air disaster